Marla Spivak (born 1955) is an American entomologist, and Distinguished McKnight University Professor at the University of Minnesota specializing in apiculture and social insects.

Career and research
Spivak graduated with a B.A. from Humboldt State University and a Ph.D. from the University of Kansas.
She is particularly well known for her work breeding lines of honey bees that detect and quickly remove diseased larvae and pupae, which is called hygienic behavior. She was instrumental in setting up the first bee Tech-Transfer Team in the United States, which continues to help honey bee queen breeders select for disease resistance traits. More recently, she has begun studying the role of resins, which bees collect and mix with wax to make propolis coatings on the inside of their hives, as an example of honey bee social immunity. Her lab also studies the effect of the surrounding landscape on the health and nutrition of both honey bees and native bees.

Awards
She was awarded a MacArthur Fellowship grant in 2010 for her work with honey bees. After receiving the MacArthur grant, she started an organization called the Bee Squad, which works to help beekeepers and people in the Twin Cities community improve the health of bee pollinators. In 2015, she won the Distinguished Service Award from the Minnesota AgriGrowth Council. In 2016, she won the Siehl Prize for Excellence in Agriculture (category: Knowledge) for her many contributions to understanding bee biology and threats to bee health and a Women of Discovery Award from Wings Worldquest, honoring her pioneering work promoting bee health and conservation.
Spivak was elected a Fellow of the Entomological Society of America in 2017. In 2020 a former student of Spivak's, bee taxonomist Joel Gardner, named a species of sweat bee Lasioglossum spivakae in her honor.

Works

References

External links

 Bee Lab at University of Minnesota
 
TED Talk (Why bees are disappearing)

1955 births
Living people
American entomologists
University of Minnesota faculty
MacArthur Fellows
California State Polytechnic University, Humboldt alumni
University of Kansas alumni
Women entomologists
Coleopterists